Harvest Christian Academy (commonly known as Harvest Christian Academy Honduras and abbreviated as HCA) is a bilingual interdenominational Protestant school located in Tegucigalpa, Honduras. It offers preschool, elementary and secondary education.

External links
Site

Schools in Honduras